The Pearl Jam 1993 European/North American Tour was a concert tour by the American rock band Pearl Jam.

History
Pearl Jam embarked on this tour after completing the recording sessions for its second album, Vs. The Europe leg included a few shows in which the band opened for U2 on the band's Zoo TV Tour, while both legs included several shows in which the band opened for Neil Young on his Harvest Moon tour. Guitarist Mike McCready said that when the band opened for U2 in Europe the crowds hated Pearl Jam. The short tour of North America focused on Canada and the West Coast of the United States. When the band opened for Neil Young, Young often brought the band out for encores to perform "Rockin' in the Free World". Bassist Jeff Ament said that playing with Neil Young was "the most inspiring thing that we've ever been involved in."

Tour dates
Information taken from various sources.

Band members
Jeff Ament – bass guitar
Stone Gossard – rhythm guitar
Mike McCready – lead guitar
Eddie Vedder – lead vocals, guitar
Dave Abbruzzese – drums

Songs performed

Originals
"Alive"
"Animal"
"Black"
"Blood"
"Daughter"
"Deep"
"Dirty Frank" (snippet)
"Dissident"
"Elderly Woman Behind the Counter in a Small Town"
"Even Flow"
"Footsteps"
"Garden"
"Glorified G"
"Go"
"Hard to Imagine" (snippet)
"Indifference"
"Jeremy"
"Leash"
"Oceans"
"Once"
"Porch"
"Rats"
"Rearviewmirror"
"Release"
"State of Love and Trust"
"W.M.A."
"Whipping"
"Why Go"

Covers
"Across the Universe" (The Beatles) (snippet)
"Angie" (The Rolling Stones) (snippet)
"Baba O'Riley" (The Who)
"Beast of Burden" (The Rolling Stones) (snippet)
"Crazy Mary" (Victoria Williams)
"Fuckin' Up" (Neil Young)
"Gimme Shelter" (The Rolling Stones) (snippet)
"The Kids Are Alright" (The Who)
"MLK" (U2) (snippet)
"Owner of a Lonely Heart" (Yes)
"Pulled Up" (Talking Heads) (snippet)
"The Real Me" (The Who) (snippet)
"Rockin' in the Free World" (Neil Young)
"Ruby Tuesday" (The Rolling Stones) (snippet)
"Sonic Reducer" (The Dead Boys)
"Suck You Dry" (Mudhoney) (snippet)
"Sympathy for the Devil" (The Rolling Stones) (snippet)
"Tearing" (Rollins Band) (snippet)
"Tonight's the Night" (Neil Young) (snippet)

References

1993 concert tours
Pearl Jam concert tours